Charles Herbert "Jeff" McMurtrie (1 May 1881 – 9 August 1951) was a pioneer Australian rugby union and rugby league footballer who represented his country at both sports. He competed in rugby union at the 1908 Summer Olympics and was an early dual-code rugby international.

Rugby union
McMurtrie won Olympic Gold in London in 1908 playing rugby union for the Wallabies in the team captained by Chris McKivat.

Rugby league career
On his return to Australia he joined the fledgling code of rugby league along with a number of his Olympic teammates. He was selected in 1911 for the 2nd Kangaroo tour of Great Britain and played in 7 tour matches scoring 3 tries. He is listed on the Australian Players Register as Kangaroo No. 81.

Along with Peter Burge and Bob Stuart, McMurtie made his international league debut in a tour match in 1911 but did not play in any Tests. Collectively they were Australia's 17th to 19th dual code rugby internationals.

See also
 Rugby union at the 1908 Summer Olympics

Footnotes

References
 Andrews, Malcolm (2006) The ABC of Rugby League, Austn Broadcasting Corpn, Sydney
 Whiticker, Alan & Hudson, Glen (2006) The Encyclopedia of Rugby League Players, Gavin Allen Publishing, Sydney

External links
Charles McMurtrie's profile at databaseOlympics

1881 births
1951 deaths
Australasia rugby league team players
Australia national rugby league team players
Australian rugby league players
Australian rugby union players
Balmain Tigers players
Dual-code rugby internationals
Medalists at the 1908 Summer Olympics
Olympic gold medalists for Australasia
Olympic rugby union players of Australasia
Rugby league players from Orange, New South Wales
Rugby union players at the 1908 Summer Olympics
Rugby union players from New South Wales